Paired box protein Pax-5 is a protein that in humans is encoded by the PAX5 gene.

Function 

The PAX5 gene is a member of the paired box (PAX) family of transcription factors.  The central feature of this gene family is a novel, highly conserved DNA-binding domain, known as the paired box.  The PAX proteins are important regulators in early development, and alterations in the expression of their genes are thought to contribute to neoplastic transformation.  The PAX5 gene encodes the B-cell lineage specific activator protein (BSAP) that is expressed at early, but not late stages of B-cell differentiation.  Its expression has also been detected in developing CNS and testis, therefore, PAX5 gene product may not only play an important role in B-cell differentiation, but also in neural development and spermatogenesis.

Clinical significance 

The PAX5 gene is located in chromosome 9p13 region, which is involved in t(9;14)(p13;q32) translocations recurring in small lymphocytic lymphomas of the plasmacytoid subtype, and in derived large-cell lymphomas.  This translocation brings the potent E-mu enhancer of the IgH gene locus into close proximity of the PAX5 promoters, suggesting that the deregulation of PAX5 gene transcription contributes to the pathogenesis of these lymphomas.

Up to 97% of the Reed–Sternberg cells of Hodgkin's lymphoma express Pax-5.

Interactions 

PAX5 has been shown to interact with TLE4 and Death associated protein 6.

See also 
 Pax genes

References

Further reading

External links 
 
 
 

Transcription factors